Villefranche-du-Périgord (Languedocien: Vilafranca de Perigòrd) is a commune in the Dordogne department in Nouvelle-Aquitaine in southwestern France. Villefranche-du-Périgord station has rail connections to Périgueux and Agen.

Population

See also
Communes of the Dordogne department

References

Communes of Dordogne